Bachir Sebaâ (born April 10, 1949) is an Algerian former football player who played as a goalkeeper for MC Oran.

History
Bachir Sebaâ was summoned for the national team by Rachid Mekhloufi to play the 1978 All-Africa Games but declined the invitation.

Achievement

Algerian Cup: 1983–84, 1984–85 with MC Oran

References

External links
Player profile - FootballDatabase

1949 births
Living people
Algerian footballers
USM Oran players
MC Oran players
Footballers from Oran
Association football goalkeepers
21st-century Algerian people